The western dwarf galagos are a group of three species of strepsirrhine primates, native to western and central Africa. They are classified in the genus Galagoides of the family Galagidae. The eastern dwarf galagos (P. cocos, P. granti, P. orinus, P. rondoensis, and P. zanzibaricus) have been moved to their own genus, Paragalago, based on genetic evidence and differences in vocalization. The two genera are not sister taxa and thus may have evolved their small sizes via parallel evolution. They are separated by the East African Rift.

The first genus to be introduced to scientific literature was Galago by Geoffroy Saint-Hilaire. The genus was based on a smaller species from West Africa. Later, the genus Galagoides was introduced by Sir Andrew Smith in 1833. Smith wanted to differentiate the dwarf (Gd. demidovii) and the lesser galagos from the 'true galagos.' Otolemur was later introduced to indicate the greater galagos by Coquerel in 1859. Before the 21st century, three new dwarf galagos were recognized as species.

Galagoides species
 Prince Demidoff's bushbaby — Gs. demidovii
 Angolan dwarf galago — Gs. kumbirensis
 Thomas's bushbaby — Gs. thomasi

References

External links

Galagidae
Galagos
Primates of Africa
Taxa named by Andrew Smith (zoologist)
Taxonomy articles created by Polbot
Taxa described in 1833